= Title of office =

Title of office may have one of the following meanings:

- Title of authority, also known as a title of command - the official designation of a position held in an organization associated with certain duties of authority
- Style (manner of address), an expression of respect (honorific) for persons holding or capable to hold certain positions
